Serangoon MRT station is an underground Mass Rapid Transit (MRT) interchange station on the North East (NEL) and Circle (CCL) lines. Situated in Serangoon, Singapore along Upper Serangoon Road and Serangoon Central, the station is integrated with the Nex shopping complex and the Serangoon Bus Interchange. The station is near the Serangoon Neighbourhood Police Centre and Braddell Heights Community Hub and serves various residential estates in the area.

Preliminary studies for the NEL in the late 1980s included a tentative line alignment serving the Serangoon area. The station was confirmed in 1996; its construction involved the erection of the road viaduct above Upper Serangoon Road. In October 1999, it was announced that the station would interchange with the CCL. The NEL station was completed in June 2003. During the construction of the CCL tunnels, ground settlement caused the NEL station to sink, leading to a brief halt in excavation works. The CCL platforms opened in May 2009 as part of Stage 3 of the CCL.

The station has eight entrances, four of which are triangular and enclosed in cubic structures. The station features three artworks as part of the MRT network's Art-in-Transit programme. The NEL platforms and concourse display woodcut prints as part of Eng Joo Heng's artwork Memories of Childhood. The CCL station's concourse features the painting View of Life by Sarkasi Said, while the CCL platforms contain a set of art seats entitled Matrix.

History

North East line

In preliminary studies for the North East line (NEL) in 1986, it was planned for the line to serve the Serangoon area, traveling along Serangoon Road and Upper Serangoon Road. The line was not considered financially viable at the time; it was only in 1996 that the government approved plans to construct the line "immediately".

Serangoon station was among the 16 NEL stations announced by communications minister Mah Bow Tan in March 1996. The station opened on 20 June 2003.

To facilitate the station's construction, the Paya Lebar Methodist Church and Braddell Heights Community Centre were relocated. As part of the Serangoon town centre's redevelopment, the area had also been designated for commercial developments. The community centre relocated closer to the town centre, sharing premises with the Singapore National Wushu Federation. A few public facilities were taken over, and new carpark lots and a new basketball court were built as replacements.

As workers diverted Upper Serangoon Road for the construction works, the road capacity was maintained using the adjacent road reserve spaces. The scope of the project also involved building the new road viaduct above Upper Serangoon Road. Hence, the works had to be carefully scheduled to take into account the various technical aspects of each part of the project. The tunnels were bored first, and the station's roof slab was finished afterward. The pillars for the road viaduct were installed above ground after the roof slab was completed.

The area's grassroots leaders conveyed residents' complaints about the construction noises to the Land Transport Authority (LTA). In response, the LTA explained the work progress and assured the residents that the inconvenience was temporary; the completion of the MRT station would make the area more convenient. The contractors monitored the surrounding residential buildings to ensure that the foundations were not affected.

Circle line

In October 1999, it was announced that Serangoon station would interchange with a proposed MRT line linking Buona Vista and Paya Lebar via Bishan and Serangoon. Provisions were made for the existing NEL station to link with the future Circle line (CCL) platforms. In January 2003, the LTA announced that Serangoon CCL station would be constructed as part of CCL Stage 3 (CCL3). The  segment consisted of five stations, between the Bartley and Marymount stations, and was expected to be completed by early 2008. The contract for the construction of the CCL station was awarded to a joint venture of Shanghai Tunnel Engineering Co (Singapore) Pte Ltd, Woh Hup and Alpine Mayreder.

Due to a build-up of pressure while boring the CCL tunnels, white foam appeared at the junction of Serangoon Avenue 2 and Avenue 3, leading to the temporary closure of one lane at the junction in February 2005. Tunneling works were suspended to ease the pressure build-up. As the tunnels underneath the NEL station were being excavated later that month, the contractors encountered a large amount of groundwater that seeped into the work site. Excavation works were suspended as water was being pumped out. As a precautionary measure, NEL trains had to slow down when arriving or departing from the station. A new tunnel design was implemented, with new construction methods such as jet grouting and a more comprehensive monitoring system to detect any further settlement of the NEL tunnels and the viaduct.

With the Nicoll Highway collapse in April 2004, the opening of the entire line was expected to be delayed to 2010, as the LTA hoped to open all five stages at one go. In January 2008, transport minister Raymond Lim announced that CCL3 would open ahead of schedule in the middle of 2009. As later announced by the transport minister in February 2009, CCL3 opened for service on 30 May 2009.

As part of a joint emergency preparedness exercise by the LTA and train operators SBS Transit and SMRT, security screenings were held at this station on 7 December 2021. The screening machines deployed for the exercise included metal detectors and X-Ray machines to check commuters' belongings. Such exercises were conducted to test established response protocols and maintain vigilance for quicker and more effective responses during emergencies and heightened security situations.

Station details

Serangoon station is an interchange on the NEL and the CCL; its official station code is NE12/CC13. On the NEL, the station is between the Woodleigh and Kovan stations. On the CCL, the station is between the Bartley and Lorong Chuan stations. The station serves the Serangoon area. The NEL station is underneath Upper Serangoon Road at the junction with Serangoon Central, while the CCL station is underneath the Nex shopping complex.

The station has eight entrances. Four of the entrances are triangular, each encased in a cubic structure which are painted in different colours to mark each entrance. The station is integrated with the Serangoon Bus Interchange and the commercial development of Nex as part of the Serangoon Integrated Transport Hub. Surrounding the station are educational institutions such as St. Gabriel's Secondary School, Yangzheng Primary School and Zhonghua Secondary School, alongside public amenities such as Serangoon Neighbourhood Police Centre, Braddell Heights Community Hub, Braddell Heights Fire Post, Marine Parade Town Council and the Serangoon Central Post Office. Residential developments around the station include Sunshine Terrace, La Belle and Forest Woods Residences.

The NEL and CCL platforms are wheelchair-accessible. A tactile system, consisting of tiles with rounded or elongated raised studs, guides visually impaired commuters through the station, with dedicated routes that connect the station entrances to the platforms or between the lines. There are wider fare gates that allow easier access for wheelchair users into the station.

The NEL station is designated as a Civil Defence (CD) shelter. It is designed to accommodate at least 7,500 people and can withstand airstrikes and chemical attacks. Equipment essential for the operations in the CD shelter is mounted on shock absorbers to prevent damage during a bombing. When electrical supply to the shelter is disrupted, there are backup generators to keep operations going. The shelter has dedicated built-in decontamination chambers and dry toilets with collection bins that will send human waste out of the shelter.

Station artwork
The station displays three artworks as part of the MRT network's Art-in-Transit programme – a showcase of public artworks on the MRT network.

Memories of Childhood

Eng Joo Heng's Memories of Childhood is a series of woodcut prints displayed in silk screens or vitreous enamel wall panels at the NEL platforms and concourse. Various children are depicted as playing with dragonfiles and puppies. Eng intended for his work to connect to various generations and allow observers to look back happily at their childhoods, with the older generation passing on to their children stories about the kampung days.

Through his former work as a printmaker at a Parisian art studio, Eng had explored the possibilities of printmaking and used the technique for this work. The artist enjoyed the simplicity of the technique, which did not require complex tools or machinery and could be done anywhere. He felt that the wood textures produced would leave a strong impression on commuters.  His early sketches on paper had more specific symbolism related to the theme of childhood but were later revised to more generic images for all commuters to appreciate. Primary colours were predominantly used, giving vibrancy to the artwork. The colours also reflect children's crayon drawings and their view of the world, as well as the colours used at the station's entrances. The work was crafted during school holidays and weekends, as Eng preferred to work in daylight to have a better view of his work.

View of Life
Displayed at the CCL concourse level, View of Life by Sarkasi Said is a batik painting of various colours in strokes intending to express movements of change and nature. Inspired by the lalangs that used to grow in the Serangoon area, the work was intended to reflect the artist's love of batik painting.

Feeling that Singapore's development was underappreciated, Sarkasi decided to create a painting that reflects the "optimism, joy and vitality" of the country's achievements. Initially, the artist wanted to do an impressionist painting, but eventually decided to challenge commuters to think of art "beyond just aesthetics", giving them a learning experience on art as they "communicate what they see" from the work. The type of each brush stroke on the painting depended on the artist's movements and character. The coloured wax was splashed on the white canvas. Using wax-resist, the artist treated each splash with chemicals to dye the colour on the canvas made of thick denim material.

Created in Sarkasi's studio in Indonesia, the work involved nature. The dyes needed sunlight to bring out the colour, with varying weather conditions affecting how the colours came out. With concerns of possible damage the painting might face due to constant exposure to commuter traffic, a photographed digital copy was installed at the station. Even if the original work was protected by glass, the panels might still break. The painting was photographed, printed and laminated before being mounted on the station walls. The original was donated to the museum at the National University of Singapore. Some of the panels were mounted upside down, but Sarkasi corrected the panels' alignments.

Matrix

The CCL platforms of Serangoon station feature a set of "art seats" entitled Matrix. Though the platform seats are intended to be works of art, they are designed to remain functional and practical. This work by Lui Honfay and Yasmine Chan, along with Rain, was selected through the International Art Seats Design Competition in 2006. Matrix consists of a series of benches engraved with the station name in a dot-matrix style on the seat surface. The dot-matrix system was adopted as it was flexible enough to be mass-produced for use in many stations. The intriguing combination of signage and seat "impressed" the judges who awarded it the top prize.

References

Bibliography

External links

 SBS Transit's Serangoon MRT station official website
 

Railway stations in Singapore opened in 2003
Railway stations in Serangoon
Mass Rapid Transit (Singapore) stations